Reinaldo del Prette Lissot (17 February 1952 – 21 November 2022) was a Venezuelan Roman Catholic prelate.

Del Prette Lissot was born in Venezuela and was ordained to the priesthood in 1976. Del Prette Lissot served as titular bishop of Altava and auxiliary bishop of the Roman Catholic Archdiocese of Valencia in Venezuela from 1994 to 1997 and then served as coadjutor bishop and diocesan bishop of the Roman Catholic Diocese of Maracay from 1997 to 2007. He then served as the archbishop of the Archdiocese of Valencia in Venezuela from 2007 until his death in 2022.

References

1952 births
2022 deaths
Venezuelan Roman Catholic bishops
21st-century Roman Catholic archbishops in Venezuela
Roman Catholic archbishops of Valencia en Venezuela
Roman Catholic bishops of Maracay
Bishops appointed by Pope John Paul II
Bishops appointed by Pope Benedict XVI